Heinrich von Hattingen, O. Carm. (died 1519) was a Roman Catholic prelate who served as Auxiliary Bishop of Minden (1515–1519).

Biography
Heinrich von Hattingen was ordained a priest in the Order of the Brothers of the Blessed Virgin Mary of Mount Carmel. On 10 Dec 1515, he was appointed during the papacy of Pope Leo X as Auxiliary Bishop of Minden, and Titular Bishop of Lydda. He served as Auxiliary Bishop of Minden until his death in 1519.

References 

16th-century German Roman Catholic bishops
Bishops appointed by Pope Leo X
1519 deaths
Carmelite bishops